Feria is a Spanish municipality in the province of Badajoz, Extremadura.

References

External links
Official website 
Profile 

 auto

Municipalities in the Province of Badajoz